Brigadier General William O. Darby (February 8, 1911 – April 30, 1945) was a career United States Army officer who fought in World War II, where he was killed in action at age 34 in Italy. He was posthumously promoted to brigadier general. Darby led the famous Darby's Rangers, which evolved into the United States Army Rangers. Darby was subsequently portrayed by James Garner in the 1958 theatrical film about Darby's career titled Darby's Rangers.

Early military career

Darby's first assignment was as assistant executive and supply officer with the 82nd Field Artillery at Fort Bliss, Texas. In July 1934, he transferred to Cloudcroft, New Mexico, where he commanded the 1st Cavalry Division detachment. He received intensive artillery training from September 1937 to June 1938 while attending Field Artillery School at Fort Sill, Oklahoma.

On September 9, 1940, Darby was promoted to captain and subsequently served with the 80th Division at Camp Jackson, South Carolina; Fort Benning, Georgia; Camp Beauregard, Louisiana; and Fort Des Moines, Iowa.

World War II

Army Rangers

As World War II progressed, Darby saw rapid promotion to the grade of lieutenant colonel. He was with the first United States troops sent to Northern Ireland after the United States entry into World War II, and during his stay there he became interested in the British Commandos. On June 19, 1942, the 1st Ranger Battalion was sanctioned, recruited, and began training in Carrickfergus, Northern Ireland.  When the United States Army decided to establish its Ranger units, Darby gained a desired assignment to direct their organization and training. Many of the original Rangers were volunteers from the Red Bull, the 34th Infantry Division, a National Guard division and the first ground combat troops to arrive in Europe.

"Darby's Rangers" trained with their British counterparts in Scotland. In 1943, the 1st Ranger Battalion made its first assault at Arzew, Algeria. Darby was awarded the Distinguished Service Cross for his actions on March 21–25 during that operation. The citation stated:

The 1st Ranger Battalion saw further action in the Italian Campaign. Darby received an oak leaf cluster to his Distinguished Service Cross for extraordinary heroism in July 1943 in Sicily:

Darby was also awarded the Silver Star for his actions in North Africa on February 12, 1943:

Promotions and death

Darby took part in the Allied invasion of Italy in September 1943 and was promoted to full colonel on December 11. He commanded the 179th Infantry Regiment, part of the 45th "Thunderbirds" Infantry Division during the Rome-Arno and Anzio campaigns in the Italian Campaign from February 18 to April 2, 1944.

Darby was ordered to Washington, D.C. for duty with the Army Ground Forces and later with the War Department General Staff at The Pentagon. In March 1945, he returned to Italy for an observation tour with General Henry H. Arnold.

On April 23, 1945, Brigadier General Robinson E. Duff, Assistant Division Commander of the 10th Mountain Division, was wounded; Darby took over for Duff. "Task Force Darby" spearheaded the breakout of the Fifth United States Army from the Po River valley bridgehead during the Spring 1945 offensive in Italy and reached Torbole at the head of Lake Garda.

On April 30, 1945, while Darby was issuing orders for the attack on Trento to cut off a German retreat, an artillery shell burst in the middle of the assembled officers and NCOs, killing Darby and a regimental Sergeant Major, John "Tim" Evans, and wounding several others. "Task Force Darby" continued with their mission. Two days later, on May 2, 1945, all German forces in Italy surrendered.

Darby, aged 34 at the time of his death, was posthumously promoted to brigadier general on May 15, 1945. He was buried in Cisterna, Italy. He was reinterred at Fort Smith National Cemetery in Fort Smith, Arkansas on March 11, 1949.

Legacy
 Darby's medals, military records, and uniforms are on display at the Fort Smith Museum of History in Fort Smith, and his boyhood home is open for tours.
 Camp Darby, near Fort Benning, which is home to the first phase of Ranger School, is named after him.
 Two U.S. Army installations in Europe were named after Darby; W.O. Darby Kaserne, Fürth, Germany (closed in 1995); and the operational Camp Darby, near Livorno, Italy.
 The town of Cisterna, Italy, dedicated its high school to Darby.
 A book entitled Onward We Charge: The Heroic Story of Darby's Rangers in World War II by H. Paul Jeffers was published in 2007.
 An Admiral Benson Class transport ship, the USS Admiral W. S. Sims (AP-127), was renamed USAT General William O. Darby in the 1940s.
 In 1955, the name of Fort Smith Junior High School was changed to William O. Darby Junior High School. In 1958, the name of the school's athletic teams was changed from Cubs to Rangers after the famous Darby's Rangers.
 In 1958, the motion picture Darby's Rangers, starring James Garner as Darby, dramatized Darby's military exploits. Wayde Preston also played a character role based on Darby in the 1968 film Anzio.
 In 1992, Darby was inducted into the Ranger Hall of Fame.
 Every year in Italy on April 30, there is the Col. Darby 40 Mile March from Peschiera del Garda to the Darby monument in Torbole sul Garda.

Awards and decorations
Darby's military awards include:

Badges:

Awards:

Dates of rank

References

External links

Generals of World War II

1911 births
1945 deaths
United States Army generals of World War II
United States Army generals
Colonels of the 75th Ranger Regiment
People from Fort Smith, Arkansas
Recipients of the Croix de Guerre (France)
Recipients of the Distinguished Service Cross (United States)
Recipients of the Order of Kutuzov, 3rd class
Recipients of the Silver Star
Companions of the Distinguished Service Order
United States Army Rangers
United States Military Academy alumni
Burials at Fort Smith National Cemetery
Military personnel from Arkansas
United States Army personnel killed in World War II